This article discusses the forms and functions of the personal pronouns in Catalan grammar.

Strong pronouns

The "strong" pronouns in Catalan have the following forms:

These forms are used as subject pronouns (with the exception of si), and also as disjunctive pronouns, for example, after a preposition.
Jo encara no en sé gaire. ("I still don't know much about it.")
Ell, no crec que vingui. ("Him, I don't think he's coming.")
Han preguntat per vosaltres. ("They asked about you.")

The first person singular pronoun has a special form mi after most prepositions.
Queda't amb mi. ("Stay with me.")
However, the form jo is used with some prepositions, for example, in segons jo ("according to me"), and in coordinated structures with another noun or pronoun: contra tu i jo ("against you and me").

The third person reflexive pronoun si (both singular and plural) cannot be used as a subject. 
It most commonly appears after a preposition, often reinforced by mateix:
Ho va comprar per a si mateix. ("He bought it for himself.")
Ho va comprar per a si mateixa. ("She bought it for herself.")
Ho van comprar per a si mateixos. ("They bought it for themselves (masculine).")
Ho van comprar per a si mateixes. ("They bought it for themselves (feminine).")

The 2nd person polite pronouns are vostè (singular) and vostès (plural). They combine with 3rd person verbs.
Vostè em faria un favor? ("Would you do me a favor?")
The older form vós (with 2nd person plural verb agreement) can be found in some varieties of Catalan, and in contexts like administrative texts.

The 1st person majestic plural is expressed with the pronoun Nós (in place of nosaltres).

There exists as well an impersonal subject pronoun hom (unmarked for either gender or number), always used with 3rd person singular verbs, nowadays archaic and only used in writing:
Hom no es fa monja perquè sí ("One does not become a nun because of nothing.")

Weak pronouns

The weak pronouns are proforms that, as the name indicates, do not carry stress. All are monosyllabic clitics, and all must always appear immediately before or after a verb: they cannot be used on their own or attached to a different element of the sentence. The combination of the verb plus the weak pronoun or pronouns always has a single stressed vowel, that of the verb.

Forms

Weak pronouns in Catalan vary according to:
the person, number, and gender of the antecedent
its syntactic function (direct or indirect object or adverbial complement).

The form of a given pronoun is determined by its position with respect to the verb, and whether it is adjacent to a vowel or a consonant in the verb. There are four possible configurations:
reinforced form (forma reforçada): used before a verb that begins with a consonant, separated from the verb by a space
Em veieu. ("You see me.")
elided form (forma elidida): used before a verb that begins with a vowel (or h-), and separated from it by an apostrophe
Això m'agrada ("I like that."; lit. "That pleases me")
full form (forma plena): used after a verb that ends in a consonant (or a diphthong ending in -u), connected to the verb with a hyphen
En Joan no vol seguir-me. ("John doesn't want to follow me.")
reduced form (forma reduïda): used after a verb that ends in a vowel, separated from it by an apostrophe (except in the case of -us)
Dóna'm un llibre. ("Give me a book.")

Not all pronouns have four distinct forms. The following table shows the complete inventory.

Uses

The weak pronouns primarily express complements of the verb.

Direct objects
 Ahir el vaig veure. ("Yesterday I saw him.")
 Ahir la vaig veure. ("Yesterday I saw her.")

Indirect objects
 Li donaràs el llibre? ("Will you give him/her the book?")

Reflexive pronouns
Reflexive – La nena es renta. ("The girl is washing herself.")
Pronominal – Tots es van penedir d'això. ("Everyone was sorry about that.")

The neuter proform ho replaces pronouns such as açò ("this"), això, allò ("that"), or tot ("everything"), or even an entire clause. 
 No ho sé. ("I don't know [the thing you just asked about].")
 -T'agrada mirar la televisió? -No, ho trobo avorrit. ("Do you like to watch TV?" "No, I think it's boring.")
 Cal netejar-ho tot. ("We have to clean it all up.")

The proform hi replaces adverbial complements such as:
Locative expressions: Sempre he tingut ganes d'anar-hi. ("I've always wanted to go [there].")
Prepositional phrases denoting manner or instrument, or starting with the prepositions a, amb, en, per, etc.: Hi estic d'acord. ("I agree [with that, with you, etc].)."
Adverbs and adjectives used with verbs other than ser, ésser, estar, semblar, esdevenir: -Que t'has llevat alegre? -Sí, m'hi he llevat. (-"Did you get up in a good mood?" -"Yes, I did.")
Intransitive verbs of perception: L'home no hi sent. ("The man can't hear.")

The adverbial proform en replaces
Prepositional phrases starting with de: Tothom en parla. ("Everyone is talking about it."); En vinc. ("I'm from there.")
Unmodified nouns or nouns preceded by numbers, quantifying adverbs or an indefinite article: Quantes cases teniu? — En tenim dues/moltes. ("How many houses do you have?" — "We have two/many [of them]."); Tens adreça de correu electrònic? — Sí, en tinc. ("Have you got an email address?" — "Yes, I do.")

Position

The weak pronouns are either proclitic (appearing immediately before the verb) or enclitic (immediately after).

Enclitic pronouns are used with infinitives, gerunds, and positive imperatives.
Pots fer-nos mandonguilles? ("Can you make us meatballs?")
Veient-ho des de fora, analitzant-ho objectivament ("Seeing it from an outsider's point of view, analyzing it objectively")
Vés-hi i espera'm. ("Go there and wait for me.")

With all other forms of the verb, the weak pronouns are proclitic. This includes, in particular, conjugated (finite) verbs and negative imperatives:
Ens faràs encara mandonguilles? ("Will you make us meatballs again?")
No m'esperis. ("Don't wait for me.")

In complex verbal constructions consisting of a conjugated verb and an infinitive or gerund, the pronoun can appear either before the first verb or after the second verb.
 Els volien atacar. or Volien atacar-los. ("They wanted to attack them.")
 L'estem escoltant. or Estem escoltant-lo. ("We are listening to him.")

Dialectal variation 

Use of weak pronouns varies significantly across the Catalan linguistic area.

Northern Catalan (particularly as spoken in Northern Catalonia) and the Balearic dialect do not generally use the reinforced forms (e.g. te veig instead of et veig).

In the imperative mood in Northern Catalan, the reduced form of the pronoun is replaced by a tonic form (thus, not strictly being a weak pronoun anymore). For example, mira'm! (en: look at me!) in Northern Catalan is rendered as mira-mé!.

Combinations of weak pronouns

When two weak pronouns appear with the same verb, they must appear in a fixed order, as illustrated in the following table:

The two pronouns must be selected from different columns, and furthermore ho cannot combine with en or hi.

All of the combinations allowed in the standard language are given in the following table, which also shows the necessary morpho-phonological and orthographic adjustments. In each cell of the table, the forms are listed in the following order, with the same contextual conditions as explained above for the simple pronouns: 
proclitic form used before a verb that begins with a vowel
proclitic form used before a verb that begins with a consonant
enclitic form used after a verb that ends with a vowel (except "u")
enclitic form used after a verb that ends with a consonant (or "u")

In combinations like es + en, the resulting form, pronounced , could be analyzed either as s' + en or as se + 'n. The orthographic convention in such cases is to place the apostrophe as far to the right as possible: se'n, and not s'en, and similarly for se'ls, me'n, te'm, te'ns, etc. The combination of el/la with en, however, is written l'en, because there is no such pronoun as le that would justify the spelling le'n.

Impossible combinations

As mentioned above, the combinations ho + hi and ho + en are not allowed in the standard language, and must be avoided, for example by keeping only ho and leaving the other pronoun unexpressed. In some contexts, it is also acceptable to replace ho with el, giving rise to the following combinations:
ho + hi → el + hi → l'hi
(Això, a Sabadell) l'hi portaré demà. ("I will take it there tomorrow")
ho + en → el + en → l'en
In the second case, it is also possible to replace the pronoun en with hi: 
ho + en → el + hi → l'hi
(Això, de l'armari) l'en/l'hi trauré després. ("I will take it out of there afterwards")

This substitution of hi for en is also used to express the combination of en (ablative) + en (genitive), since the form *ne'n is not allowed:
en + en → en + hi → n'hi
(D'homes, del teatre) n'hi sortiran tres. ("Three of them will come out of there")

Longer combinations

Sequences of three pronouns are possible, and generally consist of one of the two-pronoun combinations from the table above, preceded by em, et, ens, us, and most commonly es (the added pronoun must not already appear in the original two-pronoun cluster).
Us posen vi als gots (They put wine in the glasses for you) → Us n'hi posen (They put some there for you)
Se t'ofereix cervesa (You are offered beer) → Se te n'ofereix (You are offered some)

Combinations of four pronouns are very rare:
Se'm posa pols a les sabates (Dust gets into my shoes) → Se me n'hi posa (Some of it [the sand] gets into them [the shoes])

The linguist Joan Solà presents a progression that culminates in a combination of six weak pronouns:
Aquell amic nostre (→ te me) és capaç de posar-se a casa (→ hi) tres parents (→ ’n) del senyor Pere (→ li) (That friend of ours is able to give lodging in his house to three relatives of Senyor Pere) → Se te me li n’hi posarà tres

Variants

Combinations of weak pronouns are subject to wide regional and stylistic variation, and in several cases the normative rules presented above do not reflect actual usage.

For example, alongside the transparently derived forms of li + direct object pronoun (el, la, els, les) given in the table above, central Catalan varieties replace li with hi:li + el → el + hi → l'hi (instead of li'l)li + la → la + hi → la hi (instead of li la)li + els → els + hi → els hi (instead of li'ls)li + les → les + hi → les hi (instead of li les)
Furthermore, the feminine forms can merge phonetically with the masculine forms, i.e. la hi is pronounced like l'hi and les hi like els hi.

Combinations of li with en and ho can also undergo modification:li + en → en + hi → n'hi (instead of li'n)li + ho → el + hi → l'hi (instead of li ho)

In more colloquial registers, the plural indirect object pronoun els is realized as els hi, and this extended form is used instead of all combinations of els followed by a 3rd person direct object pronoun:els + el/la/els/les/ho → els hiThe elided proclitic forms ens n' and us n' are regularly replaced by the unelided forms ens en and us en before a verb starting with a vowel. For example:Ens en anem, instead of Ens n'anemUs en alegreu, instead of Us n'alegreu''

See also

Pro-drop language
Prepositional pronoun
Clitic doubling

Footnotes

References

External links
ésAdir: Pronoms 

Catalan grammar
Pronouns by language